The 2018 Levene Gouldin & Thompson Tennis Challenger was a professional tennis tournament played on hard court. It was the 25th edition of the tournament which was part of the 2018 ATP Challenger Tour. It took place in Binghamton, United States between 23 and 29 July 2018.

Singles main-draw entrants

Seeds

 1 Rankings are as of July 16, 2018.

Other entrants
The following players received wildcards into the singles main draw:
  Alafia Ayeni
  William Blumberg
  Martin Redlicki
  Alex Rybakov

The following player received entry into the singles main draw using a protected ranking:
  Alejandro Gómez

The following player received entry into the singles main draw as a special exempt:
  Bradley Klahn

The following players received entry from the qualifying draw:
  Andrew Harris
  Jared Hiltzik
  Alexander Ritschard
  Mikael Torpegaard

The following player received entry as a lucky loser:
  Antoine Escoffier

Champions

Singles 

  Jay Clarke def.  Jordan Thompson 6–7(6–8), 7–6(7–5), 6–4

Doubles 

  Gerard Granollers /  Marcel Granollers def.  Alejandro Gómez /  Caio Silva 7–6(7–2), 6–4.

External links
Official Website

2018 ATP Challenger Tour
2018
2018 in American tennis
2018 in sports in New York (state)
July 2018 sports events in the United States